Thomas, Tom or Tommy Bowen may refer to:
 Thomas H. Bowen (1850–1896), South Australian surveyor
 Thomas M. Bowen (1835–1906), U.S. Senator
 Thomas Bowen (engraver) (died 1790), map engraver
 Thomas Bowen (Wisconsin politician) (1808–1883), member of the Wisconsin State Senate
 Thomas Bowen (Independent minister) (1756–1827), Welsh Independent minister
 Thomas Jefferson Bowen (1814–1875), American expatriate Baptist missionary
 Thomas "Tom" Ambrose Bowen (1916–1982), inventor of the Bowen technique
 Tom Bowen (athletic director) (born 1961), American sports executive
 Tom Bowen (rugby union), English rugby union player
 List of Haven characters#Tommy Bowen, fictional character in Haven
 Sir Thomas Bowen, 4th Baronet (1921–1989), of the Bowen baronets
 Tommy Bowen, member of the English band White Lies

See also
 Tom Bowens (born 1940), American basketball player
 Tom Webb-Bowen (1879–1956), Royal Air Force officer
 Bowen (surname)